Nico Olsthoorn (30 January 1928 – 14 June 2011) was a Dutch speed skater. He competed in the men's 1500 metres event at the 1956 Winter Olympics.

References

External links
 

1928 births
2011 deaths
Dutch male speed skaters
Olympic speed skaters of the Netherlands
Speed skaters at the 1956 Winter Olympics
People from Naaldwijk
Sportspeople from South Holland
20th-century Dutch people